Anthony Parel (born 1926) is a Canadian historian, author and academic. He has authored and edited a number of books, on subjects including Thomas Aquinas, Niccolò Machiavelli, Mohandas Karamchand Gandhi and South Asian history.

More broadly, he is interested in exploring the relationship between the political, the economic, and the ethical and the spiritual.

Biography
Parel was born in present-day Kerala, India in 1926. He was educated in India and the United States and received his doctorate in government from Harvard University in 1963. He taught political science at the University of Calgary, Calgary, Alberta from 1966 until retirement in 1994. Parel now occupies the post of Professor Emeritus of Political Science at the University of Calgary. He is a naturalized Canadian citizen.

Partial bibliography
Parel's works include:
 The Machiavellian Cosmos (1982)
 Gandhi's Philosophy and the Quest for Harmony (2007)
 Gandhi: Hind Swaraj and Other Writings Centenary Edition (2009) (editor)
 The Cambridge Companion to Gandhi (2011). Co-editor with Judith M. Brown.

References

1926 births
20th-century Canadian historians
Canadian male non-fiction writers
Living people
Harvard University alumni
Indian expatriates in the United States
Indian emigrants to Canada
21st-century Canadian historians